Peru schools may refer to:

 Education in Peru, relating to Peru in South America
 Peru Elementary School District 124, Peru, Illinois
 Peru Community Schools, Peru, Indiana
 Peru Central School District, Peru, New York

See also 
 Peru (disambiguation)